The 1901 Nova Scotia general election was held on 2 October 1901 to elect members of the 33rd House of Assembly of the Province of Nova Scotia, Canada. It was won by the Liberal party.

Results

Results by party

Retiring incumbents
Liberal
Charles Edward Church, Lunenburg
William A. Ferguson, Guysborough
Alexander E. Fraser, Cumberland
Thomas Keillor, Queens
John Drew Sperry, Lunenburg

Liberal-Conservative
Matthew Henry Fitzpatrick, Pictou
Thomas McMullen, Colchester

Nominated candidates
1901 Nova Scotia Provincial Election

Legend
bold denotes party leader
† denotes an incumbent who is not running for re-election or was defeated in nomination contest

Valley

|-
| rowspan="2"|Annapolis
||
|James Wilberforce Longley1,82529.60%	
|
|W. C. Healey1,34821.87%	
|
|
||
|James Wilberforce Longley
|-
||
|Joseph A. Bancroft1,75028.39%	
|
|Frank Andrews1,24220.15%	
|
|
||
|Joseph A. Bancroft
|-
| rowspan="2"|Digby
||
|Ambroise-Hilaire Comeau1,50737.12%	
|
|J. K. Tobin61115.05%	
|
|
||
|Ambroise-Hilaire Comeau
|-
||
|Angus Morrison Gidney1,40034.48%	
|
|Louis Dugas54213.35%	
|
|
||
|Angus Morrison Gidney
|-
| rowspan="2"|Hants
||
|Arthur Drysdale2,09229.54%	
|
|A. S. Sanford1,45820.58%
|
|
||
|Arthur Drysdale
|-
||
|Francis Parker McHeffey1,91427.02%	
|
|Charles Smith Wilcox1,61922.86%	
|
|
||
|Charles Smith Wilcox
|-
| rowspan="2"|Kings
||
|Brenton Dodge2,22533.97%	
|
|J. W. Ryan1,11617.04%	
|
|
||
|Brenton Dodge
|-
||
|Harry H. Wickwire2,12232.40%	
|
|Peter Innes1,08716.60%	
|
|
||
|Harry H. Wickwire
|-
|}

South Shore

|-
| rowspan="2"|Lunenburg
||
|Edward Doran Davison2,93228.24%	
|
|A. J. Wolfe2,33522.49%	
|
|
||
|John Drew Sperry†
|-
||
|Alexander Kenneth Maclean2,92328.15%	
|
|J. A. Roberts2,19221.11%	
|
|
||
|Charles Edward Church†
|-
| rowspan="2"|Queens
||
|Edward Matthew Farrell92527.95%	
|
|John Hutt78323.66%
|
|	
||
|Edward Matthew Farrell
|-
||
|Charles F. Cooper84325.48%	
|
|W. L. Libbey75822.91%	
|
|
||
|Thomas Keillor†
|-
| rowspan="2"|Shelburne
||
|Thomas Johnston81741.98%	
|
|	
|
|Arthur Hood32616.75%
||
|Thomas Johnston
|-
||
|Thomas Robertson80341.26%	
|
|	
|
|
||
|Thomas Robertson
|-
| rowspan="2"|Yarmouth
||
|Augustus StonemanAcclamation
|
|	
|
|
||
|Augustus Stoneman
|-
||
|Henry S. LeBlancAcclamation
|
|	
|
|
||
|Henry S. LeBlanc
|-
|}

Fundy-Northeast

|-
| rowspan="2"|Colchester
||
|Benjamin Franklin Pearson2,16925.34%
|
|A. S. Black2,15125.13%	
|
|
||
|Thomas McMullen†
|-
||
|Frederick Andrew Laurence2,18525.53%	
|
|John Fitzwilliam Stairs2,05424.%	
|
|
||
|Frederick Andrew Laurence
|-
| rowspan="2"|Cumberland
||
|Thomas Reuben Black2,94425.50%
|
|C. R. Smith2,72023.56%
|
|
||
|Thomas Reuben Black
|-	
|
|M. L. Tucker2,93325.41%	
||
|Daniel McLeod2,94625.52%	
|
|
||
|Alexander E. Fraser†
|-
|}

Halifax

|-
| rowspan="3"|Halifax
||
|George Mitchell4,95517.56%
|
|Adam Brown Crosby4,70716.68%	
|
|
||
|George Mitchell
|-
||
|David McPherson5,04917.89%
|
|G. M. Campbell4,48715.90%	
|
|
||
|David McPherson
|-
||
|Michael Edwin Keefe4,84017.15%	
|
|J. J. Stewart4,18514.83%	
|
|
||
|Michael Edwin Keefe
|-
|}

Central Nova

|-
| rowspan="2"|Antigonish
||
|Angus McGillivrayAcclamation
|
|
|
|
||
|Angus McGillivray
|-
||
|Christopher P. ChisholmAcclamation
|
|
|
|
||
|Christopher P. Chisholm
|-
| rowspan="2"|Guysborough
||
|William Whitman1,49835.79%
|
|John Keating62014.81%	
|
|
||
|William Akins Fergusson†
|-
||
|John Howard Sinclair1,51136.11%	
|
|H. T. Harding55613.29%	
|
|
||
|John Howard Sinclair
|-
| rowspan="3"|Pictou
||
|Edward Mortimer Macdonald3,70320.61%
|
|George E. Munro3,01116.76%	
|
|
||
|Edward Mortimer Macdonald
|-
|
|Robert Dewar3,15717.57%
||
|Charles Elliott Tanner3,18617.73%
|
|
||
|Charles Elliott Tanner
|-	
||
|George Patterson3,53419.67%	
|
|William Cameron1,3777.66%	
|
|
||
|Matthew Henry Fitzpatrick†
|-
|}

Cape Breton

|-
| rowspan="2"|Cape Breton
||
|Daniel Duncan McKenzie3,84032.29%	
|
|Colin McKinnon2,20518.54%	
|
|
||
|Daniel Duncan McKenzie
|-
||
|Neil J. Gillis3,69131.04%	
|
|Vincent Mullins2,15718.14%	
|
|
||
|Neil J. Gillis
|-
| rowspan="4"|Inverness
||
|James MacDonald2,27027.39%	
|rowspan=2|
|rowspan=2|Charles Edward McMillan1,32616.00%	
|rowspan=2|
|rowspan=2|
|rowspan=2 |
|rowspan=2|James McDonald
|-
|
|J. L. McDougall1,31715.89%
|-
||
|Moses J. Doucet1,73420.92%	
|rowspan=2|
|rowspan=2|Daniel McNeil1,13713.72%	
|rowspan=2|
|rowspan=2|
|rowspan=2 |
|rowspan=2|Moses J. Doucet
|-
|
|Alexander Macdonald5046.08%
|-
| rowspan="2"|Richmond
||
|Duncan Finlayson1,09034.64%	
|
|D. G. Stewart56217.86%	
|
|
||
|Duncan Finlayson
|-
||
|Simon Joyce99431.59%	
|
|Felix Landry50115.92%	
|
|
||
|Simon Joyce
|-
| rowspan="2"|Victoria
||
|George Henry Murray1,17737.85%	
|
|John A. McDonald58118.68%	
|
|
||
|George Henry Murray
|-
||
|John Gillis Morrison1,02332.89%	
|
|John J. McCabe32910.58%	
|
|
||
|John Gillis Morrison
|-
|}

References

Further reading
 

1901
1901 elections in Canada
1901 in Nova Scotia
October 1901 events